Sunil Nandy (born 1 February 1935) is an Indian former cricketer. He played one first-class match for Bengal in 1958/59.

See also
 List of Bengal cricketers

References

External links
 

1935 births
Living people
Indian cricketers
Bengal cricketers
Cricketers from Kolkata